The Rabbi's Cat may refer to:

 The Rabbi's Cat (comics), a French comic by Joann Sfar
 The Rabbi's Cat (film), 2011 French animated film directed by Joann Sfar and Antoine Delesvaux, based on volume one, two and five of Sfar's comics series